The black oropendola (Psarocolius guatimozinus) is a species of bird in the family Icteridae (New World blackbirds). It is found in Colombia and Panama. Its natural habitat is subtropical or tropical moist lowland forests.

Description
The sexes are similar in appearance and are mainly black, with dark chestnut back, rump, part of the wing-coverts and crissum (the area around the cloaca). There is a bluish bare patch on the cheek, edged with pink at its lowest extremity, and an orange-tipped, black beak.

Distribution and habitat
The black oropendola is endemic to humid forests of northwestern South America.

Ecology
The habits of the black oropendola have been little studied but its diet probably includes insects, small vertebrates and fruit. It clambers about high in the canopy and may sip nectar from flowers. It nests colonially, with up to twenty birds constructing their nests in one tree. The eggs are pale pink, scantily blotched with reddish brown. The black oropendola is probably polygynous, with one male mating with many females. The breeding season in Panama is February while in Colombia it is April to June.

Status
The black oropendola has a large range and is said to be fairly common. Its population trend seems to be stable and no particular threats have been identified. For these reasons, the International Union for Conservation of Nature has assessed its conservation status as being of "least concern".

References

black oropendola
Birds of Panama
Birds of Colombia
black oropendola
black oropendola
Taxonomy articles created by Polbot